The siege of Lier of 1582, also known as the capture of Lier or betrayal of Lier, took place between 1 and 2 August 1582 at Lier, near Antwerp (present-day in the Belgian province of Antwerp, Flemish Region, Belgium), during the Eighty Years' War and the Anglo-Spanish War (1585–1604). On 2 August the Spanish army commanded by Governor-General Don Alexander Farnese, Prince of Parma (Spanish: Alejandro Farnesio), supported by part of the States garrison (a discontent group of Scottish troops led by Captain William Semple), captured and seized the town, defeating the rest of the Dutch, English and German troops under Governor of Lier. The entire garrison was killed or captured. The news of the Spanish victory at Lier was a shock to the States-General at Antwerp, where the sense of insecurity was obvious, and many of the Protestant citizens sold their houses and fled to northern Flanders.

The consequences of Semple's action were considerable because Liere was a strategic position, regarded as "the bulwark of Antwerp and the key of the Duchy of Brabant". The betrayal of Bruges in the following year by Colonel Boyd was probably prompted by his countryman's example. After a short visit to Prince Alexander Farnese at Namur, Semple was sent to Spain with a strong recommendation to King Philip II of Spain, who according to the Italian Jesuit Famiano Strada, handsomely rewarded him.

The next Spanish success was on 17 November, when the Spaniards led by Johann Baptista von Taxis (Spanish: Juan Baptista de Taxis) captured Steenwijk (taken by Dutch States forces on 23 February 1581) forcing the Protestant troops to surrender.

See also
 Siege of Eindhoven (1583) 
 Fall of Antwerp
 States-General of the Netherlands
 List of Governors of the Spanish Netherlands

Notes

References
 Black, Jeremy. European Warfare 1494-1660. Routledge Publishing 2002. 
 Black, Jeremy. War in the World: A Comparative History, 1450-1600. First published 2011 by Palgrave MacMillan. 
 Jane Hathaway. Rebellion, Repression, Reinvention: Mutiny in Comparative Perspective. Library of Congress Cataloging-in-Publication Data. USA. 
 D. C. Worthington. Scots in Habsburg Service: 1618 - 1648. Library of Congress Cataloging-in-Publication Data. Printed in the Netherlands. 
 George Daniel Ramsay. The Queen's Merchants and the Revolt of the Netherlands: The End of the Antwerp mart, Vol II. Manchester University Press. 
 Tracy, James. The Founding of the Dutch Republic:War, Finance, and Politics in Holland, 1572–1588. Oxford University Press. 2008. .
 Jaques, Tony. Dictionary of Battles and Sieges: A Guide to 8,500 Battles from Antiquity Through the Twenty-first Century. Greenwood Press. 2006.

External links
 Engraving of the Siege of Lier of 1582 by Frans Hogenberg. Collection Rijksmuseum Amsterdam.

Sieges of the Eighty Years' War
Sieges involving Spain
Sieges involving England
Sieges involving the Dutch Republic
1582 in the Habsburg Netherlands
Conflicts in 1582